Jim van der Zee (born 17 January 1995) is a Dutch singer who won the 8th season of the Voice of Holland.

Life and career
Van der Zee was born on 17 January 1995, in Driebergen, in the province of Utrecht.

Discography

Singles
 "I'm on Fire"

References

External links

1995 births
Living people
Dutch singers
The Voice (franchise) winners
People from Driebergen-Rijsenburg
21st-century Dutch singers